The Klebsormidiaceae are a family containing five genera of charophyte green alga forming multicellular, non-branching filaments. The genus Chlorokybus was previously included as well, but this problematic and poorly known genus is now placed in a separate class Chlorokybophyceae.

Klebsormidiaceae are the sister to the Phragmoplastophyta. Their ancestor was probably a multicellular freshwater green algae, and multicellularity will be retained in all of its descendants except the Zygnematophyceae, which reverted back to unicellularity. Together with the unicellular Chlorokybophytina (Mesostigmatophyceae, Spirotaenia and Chlorokybophyceae), they comprise the Streptophyta.

The genera Koliella and Raphidonema were formerly classified as close relatives of Klebsormidium, based on similarities in cell division.  However, analysis of both nuclear and chloroplast DNA shows that both of these genera belong to the class Trebouxiophyceae and are not charophytes. Interfilum (previously in Ulotrichaceae) also emerged within this group.

References

External links

Charophyta
Green algae families